The Minister of State was a cabinet ministry of the Government of Ceylon that existed from 25 March 1965 to 29 May 1970 during the third Dudley Senanayake cabinet. The post was considered as the senior most cabinet minister following after the prime minister.

The post was unique, J. R. Jayewardene who was deputy leader of the United National Party and Senanayake depending heavily on Jayewardene who had held senior cabinet positions such as the first Minister of Finance. With the formation of the national government in March 1965, Jayewardene was appointed Minister of State and Parliamentary Secretary to the Minister of Defence and External Affairs and was a de facto Deputy Prime Minister. As Minister of State, Jayewardene focused on economic development and managing the foreign exchange shortages faced by Ceylon with large ministry budget allocation. In order to attracted he focused on promoting Tourism in Ceylon. To this end in 1966 he established the Ceylon Hotels Corporation with the Ceylon Hotels Corporation Act of 1966 and the Ceylon Tourist Board, by the Ceylon Tourist Board Act No. 10 of 1966. D. P. Atapattu served as Parliamentary Secretary to the Minister of State and Anandatissa de Alwis was the Permanent Secretary. The ministry was located at 54, Chalizns Street, Colombo 1.

Departments
Government Printer
Department of Control of Imports and Exports
Department of National Archives
Department of Wild Life
Zoological Gardens
Ceylon Hotels Corporation
Ceylon Tourist Board

See also
 Minister for Internal Security (Ceylon)

References 

1965 establishments in Ceylon
1970 disestablishments in Ceylon
State
Ceylon, State
Ceylon, State
State ministers
Deputy prime ministers